Onilahy is a river in Atsimo-Andrefana and Anosy (Toliara Province), southern Madagascar. It flows down from the hills near Betroka to the Mozambique Channel. It empties at St. Augustin, and into the Bay of Saint-Augustin.

Geography
Sources of the Onilahy river are near Beadabo. It flows through Ankilimary, to Benenitra, Ehara, Bezaha and Antanimena.
It is crossed by the RN 10 near Tameantsoa.
The mouth of the Onilahy river is situated in the Indian Ocean at Saint Augustin, Madagascar, 35 km south of Toliara (Tuléar).

Its main affluentes from its south are Sakamena river, Evasy River, Ianapera River, Isoanala river and the Ihazofotsy River.
From the north these are Sakondry, Taheza, Sakamare and the Imatoto rivers.

References

Rivers of Madagascar
Mozambique Channel
Ramsar sites in Madagascar
 Rivers of Atsimo-Andrefana
 Rivers of Anosy